Marcos Zambrano-Delgado (born 20 January 2005) is an Ecuadorean-American professional footballer who plays as an attacker for Benfica and the United States men's national under-19 soccer team.

Early life
Zambrano was born in Guayaquil, Ecuador. He joined the Philadelphia Union's academy with his brother Mateo at the start of 2021 having been waiting since Autumn 2020 for clearance from the US Federation. The brothers possessed US passports through their father who was born in New York.

Career
Zambrano played as the Philadelphia Union U-17s won the MLS Next Cup in 2021–2022. In August 2022 Zambrano scored for the Eastern Conference in the inaugural MLS Next All-Star Game. In January 2023 he was announced as signing with Portuguese side S.L. Benfica. A winger who play as a striker, Zambrano is expected to go straight into the squad of S.L. Benfica B.

International career
Marcos played for Ecuador's under-15 and under-17 teams, but switched nationality to the United States and was called up to the United States national under-19 team. In October 2022 Zambrano was called into the USMNT U-20 squad.

References

External links

2005 births
Living people
American soccer players
Association football forwards
United States men's youth international soccer players
Sportspeople from Guayaquil